Valentine Palmer (24 July 1935 – 10 January 2022) was a British voice coach, a singer and a television, film and theatre actor who appeared in the Doctor Who serial Day of the Daleks, The Six Wives of Henry VIII, Minder, The Professionals, The Sweeney, Emmerdale, The Saint, Dixon of Dock Green, Crossroads . Valentine was also one of the presenters of ATV Today in 1966.

As the great nephew of Charles Lightoller, the most senior member of the crew to survive the Titanic disaster, Valentine was a Titanic expert, and authored books on the subject. He also gave media interviews on the sinking, including on Channel 5's Live with Gabby on the subject. He died on 10 January 2022, at the age of 86.

Valentine’s final project was as a producer and writer on the documentary The Session Man. Currently still in production, it covers the life and career of the famous rock pianist Nicky Hopkins.

Works
Titanic!: The Strange Case of Great Uncle Bertie (2012) 
How to be a Confident Woman Speaker in just 21 Days (2012) 
 A Ruthless Conspiracy (2018)

References

External links
 Official website of Valentine Palmer
 
 Valentine Palmer in the British Film Institute Directory
 

1935 births
2022 deaths
English singers
British male actors
English male actors
English male television actors
Male actors from London